Aramaic of Hatra, Hatran Aramaic or Ashurian designates a Middle Aramaic dialect, that was used in the region of Hatra and Assur in northeastern parts of Mesopotamia (modern Iraq), approximately from the 3rd century BC to the 3rd century CE. Its range extended from the Nineveh Plains in the centre, up to Tur Abdin in the north, Dura-Europos in the west and Tikrit in the south.

Most of the evidence of the language comes from inscriptions within the cities dating between 100 BC and the mid-3rd century AD, coinciding with Shapur I's destruction of Hatra in 241 AD and Assur in 257 AD. As a result of Hatra being the site with the most attestation, Hatran Aramaic is a more common name. It is attested by inscriptions from various local sites, that were published by W. Andrae in 1912 and were studied by S. Ronzevalle and P. Jensen.  The excavations undertaken by the Iraqi Department of Antiquities brought to light more than 100 new texts, the publication of which was undertaken by F. Safar in the journal Sumer.  The first four series were the subject of reviews in the journal Syria.  The texts range in date from the 2nd or 3rd century BCE to the destruction of the city c. 240 CE; the earliest dated text provides a date of 98 BCE.

For the most part, these inscriptions are short commemorative graffiti with minimal text.  The longest of the engraved inscriptions does not have more than 13 lines.  It is therefore difficult to identify more than a few features of the Aramaic dialect of Hatra, which shows overall the greatest affinity to Syriac.

The stone inscriptions bear witness to an effort to establish a monumental script.  This script is little different from that of the Aramaic inscriptions of Assur (possessing the same triangular š, and the use of the same means to avoid confusion between m, s, and q).  The ds and the rs are not distinguished from one another, and it is sometimes difficult not to confuse w and y.

Having conquered the Aramean city-states to the west, the Neo-Assyrian Empire (911-605 BC) adopted Old Aramaic as the official language alongside the Assyrian Akkadian language. With the Achaemenid Empire succeeding them and adopting Old Aramaic, it rose to become the lingua franca of Iran, Mesopotamia and the Levant.

Development
Hatran Aramaic developed through dialectic deviation as well as producing its own script. Various dialects of Aramaic developed around major cities or regions including the sister dialect of Syriac (city of Edessa), Mandaic (region surrounding the head of the Persian Gulf, Nabataean (from the Negev to the east bank of the Jordan River and the Sinai Peninsula), Jewish Babylonian Aramaic (Babylon), Palmyrene (Palmyra) and various Palestinian sub dialects (Palestine). Syriac, Mandaic and Christian Palestinian Aramaic also developed their own variants of the original script which is still employed today by Western Neo-Aramaic speakers as well as members of the Jewish nation for Hebrew who refer to it as ‘Ktāḇ Āšūrī’ (Assyrian writing) since it was the Assyrian monarchs who promulgated it.

Hatran Aramaic and Syriac have been heavily influenced by Akkadian, partly due to the proximity to the heartland as well as the native Assyrians having adopted these two dialects.  Many commonly-used nouns such as month names were burrowed from Akkadian as well as being influenced phonologically, morphologically and syntactically.

History
The city of Nisibis came under siege several times during the Roman-Persian Wars. However, in 363 AD the Romans were forced to surrender the city to the Persians and standby as the Christian population was expelled. St Ephrem the Syrian was one of these refugees and ended up settling in Edessa. The city was flourishing with pagans, quite the opposite to his beloved Nisibis which had been a bastion for Syriac-speaking Christians. As Edessa's demographics shifted to a Christian-majority which used Syriac as the language of worship, the language rose to become the new regional lingua franca. Well over 70 important Syriac writers are known from the gold age of Syriac (5th - 9th centuries), stretching from the Levant and the Sinai to the foothills of the Zagros Mountains and Qatar. Combined with the devastation of the cities of Assur and Hatra, Syriac replaced the language of the locals and remained as a major language until its decline following the Mongol invasions and conquests and rise of the Neo-Aramaic languages.

Evidence and attestation
With Hatra enjoying great prosperity during the life of the language, the city has by far the most inscriptions with the city of Assur also containing numerous inscriptions. The rest of the evidence is spread sparsely throughout Dura-Europos, Gaddāla, Tikrit, Qabr Abu Naif, Abrat al-Sagira and Sa'adiya. The surviving corpus which has been published, transliterated and translated consists of commemorative and votive inscriptions, similar to those found in Edessa, Palmyra and among the Nabataean inscriptions. This method usually includes the date of completion of the writing, place, person who commissioned the inscription or statue as well as the scribe's own details on some occasions. Unlike the Neo-Assyrian, Neo-Babylonian and the Syriac scribes of the Sasanian realm, the regal year is not included. Both Assyro-Babylonian and Arabian gods are mentioned in the inscriptions including Ashur, Allat, Bel, Gad (Tyche), Nabu, Nasr, (Apollo), Shamash and Sin. ܽWhile both cities also attest the personal names of affluent citizens, the Hatran rulers with distinctly Parthian names are attested only in Hatra.

Grammatical sketch

Orthography

The dialect of Hatra is no more consistent than that of Palmyra in its use of matres lectiones to indicate the long vowels ō and ī; the pronominal suffix of the 3rd person plural is written indiscriminately, and in the same inscription one finds  hwn  and  hn, the quantifier  kwl  and  kl "all", the relative pronoun  dy and  d, and the word  byš and  bš "evil".

Phonology

The following features are attested:

Lenition
A weakening of ‘ayn; in one inscription, the masculine singular demonstrative adjective is written ‘dyn (‘dyn ktb’ "this inscription") which corresponds to Mandaic and Jewish Babylonian Aramaic hādēn.  Similar demonstratives, ‘adī and ‘adā, are attested in Jewish Babylonian Aramaic.

Dissimilation
 The surname ’kṣr’ "the court" (qṣr) and the proper name kṣy’, which resembles Nabataean qṣyw and the Safaitic qṣyt, demonstrate a regressive dissimilation of emphasis, examples of which are found already in Old Aramaic, rather than a loss of the emphasis of q, which is found in Mandaic and Jewish Babylonian Aramaic.
 Dissimilation of geminate consonants through n-insertion: the adjective šappīr "beautiful" is regularly written šnpyr; likewise, the divine name gadd "Tyché" is once written gd, but more commonly appears as gnd.  This is a common phenomenon in Aramaic; Carl Brockelmann, however, claims that it is a characteristic feature of the northern dialect to which Armenian owes its Aramaic loans.

Vocalism
The divine name Nergal, written nrgl, appears in three inscriptions.  The pronunciation nergōl is also attested in the Babylonian Talmud (Sanhedrin, 63b) where it rhymes with tarnəgōl, "cock."

Syntactic phonology

The Hatran b-yld corresponds to the Syriac bēt yaldā "anniversary".  The apocope of the final consonant of the substantive bt in the construct state is not attested in either Old Aramaic or Syriac; it is, however, attested in other dialects such as Jewish Babylonian Aramaic and Jewish Palestinian Aramaic.

Morphology

Verbal morphology
 The perfect: The first person singular of the perfect appears only in one inscription: ’n’ ... ktbyt "I ... wrote"; this is the regular vocalization elsewhere among those Aramaic dialects in which it is attested.
 The causative perfect of qm "demand" should be vocalized ’ēqīm, which is evident from the written forms ’yqym (which appears beside ’qym), the feminine ’yqymt, and the third person plural, ’yqmw.  This detail distinguishes Hatran as well as Syriac and Mandaic from the western Jewish and Christian dialects.  The vocalization of the preformative poses the same problem as the Hebrew hēqīm.
 The imperfect: The third person of the masculine singular is well attested; it consistently has the preformative l-.  
 In the jussive: lṭb bꜥšym "that Bacl Šemēn may announce it" (Syriac ’aṭeb(b)), l’ ldbrhn ... bqṭyr’ "that he not oppress them" (Syriac dəbar baqəṭīrā "to oppress," lit. "to carry away with force").
 In the indicative: mn dy lšḥqh "whoever strikes him" (Syriac šəḥaq), mn dy lqrhy wl’ ldkrhy "whoever reads it and does not make mention of it", mn dlꜥwl mhk’ bmšn "whoever goes from here to Mesene", kwl mn dlcbwr ... wlktwb lꜥlyh "whoever passes ... and writes over".
 The preformative l- is employed identically in the Aramaic of Assur.  The dialect of Hatra is thus further distinguished from Syriac (which uses an n- preformative) and also from Jewish Babylonian Aramaic, in which the use of the l- preformative for the indicative is not consistent.

Nominal morphology
The distinction between the three states is apparent.  As in Syriac, the masculine plural form of the emphatic state has the inflection -ē, written -’.  The confusion of this form with that of the construct state may explain the constructions bn’ šmšbrk "sons of Š." and bn’ ddhwn "their cousins." The absolute state is scarcely used: klbn "dogs" and dkyrn "(that they may be) remembered."

Numbers
The ancient Semitic construction, according to which the counted noun, in the plural, is preceded by a numeral in the construct state, with an inversion of genders, is attested by one inscription: tltt klbn "three dogs."  This same construction has been discovered in Nabataean: tltt qysrym "the three Caesars."

Syntax
As in Syriac, the analytical construction of the noun complement is common.  The use of the construct state appears to be limited to kinship terms and some adjectives: bryk’ ꜥh’.  In the analytical construction, the definite noun is either in the emphatic state followed by d(y) (e.g. ṣlm’ dy ...  "statue of...", spr’ dy brmryn’ "the scribe of (the god) Barmarēn") or is marked by the anticipatory pronominal suffix (e.g. qnh dy rꜥ’ "creator of the earth," ꜥl ḥyyhy d ... ’ḥyhy "for the life of his brother," ꜥl zmth dy mn dy ...  "against the hair (Syriac zemtā) of whomever...").  The complement of the object of the verb is also rendered analytically: ...l’ ldkrhy lnšr qb "do not make mention of N.", mn dy lqrhy lꜥdyn ktb’ "whoever reads this inscription."

Likewise, the particle d(y) can have a simple declarative meaning: ...l’ lmr dy dkyr lṭb "(a curse against whomever) does not say, 'may he be well remembered'" which can be compared with l’ lmr dy dkyr.

Vocabulary

Practically all of the known Hatran words are found in Syriac, including words of Akkadian origin, such as ’rdkl’ "architect" (Syriac ’ardiklā), and Parthian professional nouns such as pšgryb’ / pzgryb’ "inheritor of the throne" (Syriac pṣgryb’); three new nouns, which appear to denote some religious functions, are presumably of Iranian origin: hdrpṭ’ (which Safar compares with the Zoroastrian Middle Persian hylpt’ hērbed "teacher-priest"), and the enigmatic terms brpdmrk’ and qwtgd/ry’.

Alphabet

The Hatran alphabet is the script used to write Aramaic of Hatra, a dialect that was spoken from approximately 98/97 BC (year 409 of the Seleucid calendar) to 240 AD by early inhabitants of present-day northern Iraq. Many inscriptions of this alphabet could be found at Hatra, an ancient city in northern Iraq built by the Seleucid Empire and also used by the Parthian Empire, but subsequently destroyed by the Sassanid Empire in 241 AD. Assur also has several inscriptions which came to an end following its destruction by the Sasanian in 257 AD while the rest of the inscriptions are spread sparsely throughout Dura-Europos, Gaddala, Tur Abdin, Tikrit, Sa'adiya and Qabr Abu Naif. Many of the contemporary ruins were destroyed by Islamic State of Iraq and the Levant in early 2015. It was encoded in the Unicode Standard 8.0 with support from UC Berkeley's Script Encoding Initiative.

The script is written from right to left, as is typical of Aramaic scripts and of most abjads. Numerals are also written from right to left (bigger place value on the right), and there are two known punctuation marks as well. Some common ligatures also exist, and they don't appear to be necessary, and are rather just a shorthand form of writing. Some 600 texts are known to exist.

The Ashurian alphabet consists of the following letters. Ligatures have been used in certain inscriptions, although it appears to be optional.

Unicode

Hatran/Ashurian script was added to the Unicode Standard in June, 2015 with the release of version 8.0.

The Unicode block for Hatran/Ashurian is U+108E0–U+108FF:

See also
 Aramaic language
 Arabic alphabet
 Aramaic studies
 Palmyra
 Roman-Persian Wars
 Syriac

References

Sources

 
 
 Caquot, André. "L'araméen de Hatra." Comptes rendus du groupe linguistique d'études Chamito-Sémitiques 9 (1960–63): 87-89.
 
 
 Brugnatelli, Vermondo, "Osservazioni sul causativo in aramaico e in semitico nord-occidentale", Atti del Sodalizio 

Glottologico Milanese 25 (1984), p. 41-50.(text online)

External links 

 Alphabets of Yesterday and Today: Hatra

Aramaic languages
Languages attested from the 1st century BC
Languages extinct in the 3rd century